is a railway station in Kurume, Fukuoka, Japan. It is operated by the Kyushu Railway Company (JR Kyushu).

Lines 
Kurume Station is served by the following lines.
 Kyushu Shinkansen
 Kagoshima Main Line
 Kyūdai Main Line

Platforms

History 
In the next phase of expansion, the track was extended southwards to Kurume, which opened as the new southern terminus on 1 March 1890. When the Kyushu Railway was nationalized on 1 July 1907, Japanese Government Railways (JGR) took over control of the station. On 12 October 1909, the station became part of the Hitoyoshi and Nagasaki Main Lines. On 21 November 1909, the Hitoyoshi Main Line was renamed the Kagoshima Main Line. With the privatization of Japanese National Railways (JNR), the successor of JGR, on 1 April 1987, JR Kyushu took over control of the station.

Passenger statistics
In fiscal 2016, the station was used by 7,743 passengers daily (boarding passengers only), and it ranked 21st among the busiest stations of JR Kyushu.

References

External links

Railway stations in Japan opened in 1890
Railway stations in Fukuoka Prefecture
Kurume